Vinayak Radhakrishna Samant (born 25 October 1972 in Mumbai, Maharashtra) is an Indian cricketer who played for Tripura, Mumbai and Assam. He is right-hand wicket-keeper batsman. Samant mainly played in the shadow of Sameer Dighe as Dighe was first-choice keeper for Mumbai. Samant played for Assam from 1995 to 2001. He returns to Mumbai when Sameer Dighe retire. He played eight seasons with Mumbai before moving to Tripura an retiring in 2012. Since retiring he took-up coaching, becoming the head coach for Mumbai in July 2018.

References

External links
 

1972 births
Living people
Indian cricketers
Assam cricketers
Mumbai cricketers
Tripura cricketers
Cricketers from Mumbai
Indian cricket coaches
Wicket-keepers